Sălățig is a commune located in Sălaj County, Crișana, Romania. It is composed of five villages: Bulgari (Nyírfalva), Deja (Désháza), Mineu (Menyő), Noțig (Nagyszeg) and Sălățig.

Sights 
 Wooden Church in Bulgari, built in the 16th century (1547), historic monument
 Wooden Church in Noțig, built in the 19th century (1842), historic monument
 Reformed Church in Mineu, built in the 16th century (1514), historic monument
 Reformed Church in Sălățig, built in the 18th century (1753)
 Reformed Church in Deja, built in the 19th century (1841)

References

Image Gallery 

Communes in Sălaj County
Localities in Crișana